Joko Pinurbo (born 11 May 1962) is an Indonesian poet. His poetry is a mixture of narrative, irony, and self-reflection.

Joko Pinurbo was from the family of an elementary school teacher. He graduated from the Department of Language and Literature Indonesia Sanata Dharma, Yogyakarta in 1987. He then taught at his alma mater while helping culture magazine Basis. He has been editor of Base, Slot, and Sadhar published Sanata Dharma University. He also worked at PT Grasindo Yogyakarta.
 
He is currently working as the editor of Scholastic Script Bank while volunteering in several private institutions and helps the journal Poetry. His work is published in various newspapers, magazines, journals, anthologies and books. His collected poems  Celana (1999) and Di Bawah Kibaran Sarung (2001). In 2001 he won Penghargaan Buku Puisi Terbaik Dewan Kesenian Jakarta, Hadiah Sastra Lontar, and Sih Award (Penghargaan Puisi Terbaik Jurnal Puisi). He was also elected as a literary figure in Tempo magazine. He often appears in discussions and poetry readings at various places / forums, among other transnational Poetry Festival in Jakarta (2001), Winternachten Literature Festival in the Netherlands (2002) and the International Poetry Festival in Solo (2002).

His works
Joko Pinurbo began writing poetry during his late 20s even though he had been reading Indonesian poetry since he was young. When writing poetry, he often creates a mixture of reality and dreams, wisdom with comic elements, the arrogant and the pedestrian, that all can be found in one line and pronounced in one breath.

His work has been published in various newspapers, magazines, journals, anthologies and books. His collected poems Celana (1999) and Di Bawah Kibaran Sarung was published in 2001. In 2001 he won Penghargaan Buku Puisi Terbaik Dewan Kesenian Jakarta, Hadiah Sastra Lontar, and Sih Award (Penghargaan Puisi Terbaik Jurnal Puisi). He was also selected as a literary figure in Tempo magazine. He often appears in discussions and poetry readings in various locations and forums such as the transnational Poetry Festival in Jakarta (2001), the Winternachten Literature Festival in the Netherlands (2002), and the International Poetry Festival in Solo (2002).

Some of Pinurbo's poems seem to be parodies of traditional Indonesian poetry. He was also fond of using imagery that seemed cliche and was rarely found in Indonesia, for example he uses objects commonly found everyday, such as bags, mobile phones, bathrooms, trousers in his work.

Joko Pinurbo's poetry collections
 Celana, IndonesiaTera, Magelang, 1999
 Di Bawah Kibaran Sarung, IndonesiaTera, Magelang, 2001
 Pacarkecilku, IndonesiaTera, Magelang, 2002
 Telepon Genggam, Kompas, Jakarta, 2003
 Kekasihku, Kepustakaan Populer Gramedia, Jakarta, 2004
 Pacar Senja: Seratus Puisi Pilihan, Grasindo, Jakarta, 2005
 Kepada Cium, Gramedia Pustaka Utama, Jakarta, 2007
 Celana Pacarkecilku di Bawah Kibaran Sarung, Gramedia Pustaka Utama, Jakarta, 2007 
 Tahilalat, Omahsore, Yogyakarta, 2012
 Haduh, aku di-follow, Kepustakaan Populer Gramedia, Jakarta, 2013
 Baju Bulan: Seuntai Puisi Pilihan, Gramedia Pustaka Utama, Jakarta, 2013

In addition to poetry, Pinurbo also writes essays. His works are published in various magazines and newspapers including:  Horison, Basis, Kalam, Citra Yogya, Jurnal Puisi, Mutiara, Suara Pembaruan, Media Indonesia, Republika, Kompas, and Bernas. His poems are also published in various anthologies such as: Tugu (1986), Tonggak (1987), Sembilu (1991), Ambang (1992), Mimbar Penyair Abad 21 (1996), and Utan Kayu Tafsir dalam Permainan (1998).

Awards
As an appreciation of his work, Joko Pinurbo has received many awards, such as the Best Poetry Book Award 2001 Jakarta Arts Council, Hadiah Sastra Lontar, and Sih Award (Best Poetry Award Journal poetry) and he was also elected as a literary figure magazine Tempo. On an international scale, Joko Pinurbo has been invited to read poetry at the Poetry Festival Winternachten transnational 2001 in London, Festival of Literature / Arts Winternachten 2002 in the Netherlands, Indonesian Poetry Forum in 2002 in Hamburg, Germany, and the International Poetry Festival-Indonesia 2002 in Solo. His anthology Di Bawah Kibaran Sarung won one of the prizes for best 1998-2000 poetry collection from the Jakarta Arts Council. In 1997 one of his essays was awarded a prize by the literary magazine Horison.

References

1962 births
Living people
20th-century Indonesian poets
Indonesian writers
21st-century Indonesian poets
Indonesian male poets
20th-century male writers
21st-century male writers